The Dunoon Observer and Argyllshire Standard is a weekly tabloid newspaper serving the Cowal Peninsula area of Argyll and Bute, in western Scotland. It is edited and printed in Dunoon, and is known locally as the Standard. The newspaper is owned by Argyll Media Ltd. It was published by E&R Inglis Ltd. until 2015, when the owners, Marion and John Carmichael, decided to retire. It had been in the Inglis family for 144 years.

History
Founded on 25 March 1871 in nearby Sandbank by William Inglis, Sr, who was editor and proprietor, it moved to Dunoon for the first time in 1906. That year its printing was moved to Oban, where it was printed alongside The Oban Times. Printing returned to Dunoon in 1991. The newspaper currently has a circulation of around 5,500.

In 2015, upon the retirement of the Carmichaels, the newspaper was purchased by Argyll Media Ltd. The editorial offices remain in Dunoon.

In 2019 Argyll Media Ltd launched a second newspaper, The Isle of Bute News.

The current editor is Michael Symonds

References

External links
Dunoon Observer and Argyllshire Standard online edition

Newspapers published in Scotland
Newspapers with Scottish Gaelic content
Publications established in 1871
Mass media in Argyll and Bute
Mass media in Dunoon
1871 establishments in Scotland